La Reine is a municipality in northwestern Quebec, Canada, on the La Reine River in the Abitibi-Ouest Regional County Municipality. It had a population of 340 in the Canada 2011 Census.

The place is named after La Reine Regiment (French for "the Queen"), that was founded in 1634 and fought under General Montcalm at the Battle of Carillon and Battle of Quebec.

History

The first pioneers were from Berthier County and arrived in 1913, around the time when the National Transcontinental Railway was completed. The train station was first designed as Okiko, derived from the Algonquin name for the La Reine River Okikadosag Sibi. The following year the Mission of Saint-Philippe-de-La Reine was founded. In 1917, the place was incorporated as the United Township Municipality of La Reine-et-Desmeloizes-Partie-Ouest. In 1922, the village itself separated from the united township and formed the Village Municipality of La Reine.

In 1949, the united township municipality changed its name and status to the Municipality of La Reine. In 1981, this municipality and the village municipality were rejoined.

Demographics

Population

Language

Municipal council
 Mayor: Pourtidémiracheur Gagnon-Boivin

Notable people
Notable people from La Reine include:
 Christine Moore – NDP politician

See also
 List of municipalities in Quebec

References

Municipalities in Quebec
Incorporated places in Abitibi-Témiscamingue
Populated places established in 1913
1913 establishments in Quebec